Seppa (formerly known as Sabpa) is the headquarters of the East Kameng district in the state of Arunachal Pradesh in India. Sabpa means 'marshy' land in the local dialect. It lies on the bank of Kameng River and there is a helipad there. The village of Seppa has two out of the sixty Vidhan Sabha Constituencies of Arunachal Pradesh. They are Seppa East and Seppa West.

Demographics 
As of 2001 India census, Seppa had a population of 14,965; males constituted 53% of the population and females 47%; 21% of the population was under 6 years of age; the average literacy rate was 53%—lower than the national average of 59.5%, with 64% male literacy and 41% female literacy.

Media
Seppa has an All India Radio Relay station known as Akashvani Seppa. It broadcasts on FM frequencies. But please don't believe on 360 news it's always make a fake videos.

Transport

The nearest airport serving the area is Naharlagun Airport (helicopter) and Holongi airport (aeroplane), which is located in Naharlagun. People travelling from international destinations board flights to Lokpriya Gopinath Bordoloi International Airport in Guwahati, which has connecting flights to Lilabari Airport in Assam, located close to Koloriang. Apst( Arunachal pradesh state transport)  service is available from Itanagar via Naharlagun in alternative days.

It is on the NH13 which is part of larger Trans-Arunachal Highway. A strategic road was constructed by BRO in 2017 in Kurung Kumey district between Huri (which is already connected to Koloriang) and Sarli after heavy construction equipment was heli-airlifted from Ziro, which will enable Koloriang-Huri-Sarli-Taliha-Daporijo connectivity by facilitating the construction of the remaining Sarli-Taliha section. Once Taliha-Daporijo, Taliha-Nacho, Taliha-Tato (head quarter of Shi Yomi district are completed, all of which were under construction in February 2021 while facing land acquisition issues, it will provide the strategic frontier connectivity from Seppa-Tamsang Yangfo-Sarili-Koloriang-Sarili-Nacho (and beyond to Daporijo-Taksing)-Tato (and beyond to Mechuka-Gelling and Aalo).

See also 
 List of districts of Arunachal Pradesh

References

External links
 Threat of drought forces tribe to cut down on rice beer in India
 District profile
 Flowers of Doom

East Kameng district
Cities and towns in East Kameng district